Crack the Sky is an album recorded by Mylon LeFevre in 1987 and released in 1987.

Track listing

Personnel
 Mylon LeFevre - vocals, guitars
 Ben Hewitt - digital drums, percussion
 Kenneth Bentley - bass, vocals
 Scott Allen - guitars, vocals
 Paul Joseph - synthesizers, vocals
 Michael Tyrrell - guitars, vocals
 Trent Argante - guitars, vocals

1987 albums
Contemporary Christian music albums by American artists
Mylon LeFevre albums